Ferris High School may refer to several schools in the United States:

 James J. Ferris High School, Jersey City, New Jersey
 Joel E. Ferris High School, Spokane, Washington
 Ferris High School (Ferris, Texas), Ferris, Texas